Carmel Convent High School, Durgapur is an English-medium Secondary school for girls, affiliated to CISCE and run by the Sisters of Apostolic Carmel, a Roman Catholic organization. Students of the school typically refer to themselves as Carmelites.

The school is in Durgapur, West Bengal, India, in the M.A.M.C. locality.

See also
Education in India
List of schools in India
Education in West Bengal

References

External links
School website

Carmelite educational institutions
Catholic secondary schools in India
Catholic schools in India
Primary schools in West Bengal
High schools and secondary schools in West Bengal
Girls' schools in West Bengal
Christian schools in West Bengal
Schools in Paschim Bardhaman district
Education in Durgapur, West Bengal
Educational institutions established in 1964
1964 establishments in West Bengal